Two ships of the Royal Navy were named HMS Saxifrage after the genus of holarctic perennial plants:

 , an  launched in 1918 and renamed  HMS President in 1922, becoming a Royal Naval Reserve drill ship on the River Thames. She was sold in 1988, passing through a series of private owners and is used as a venue for conferences and functions.
 , a  launched in 1942 and transferred in August 1947 to Royal Norwegian Navy as the weather ship Polarfront I. She was scrapped in 1979.

References
 

Royal Navy ship names